Grace A. Clark is an American signal processing and acoustics researcher, formerly a researcher at the Lawrence Livermore National Laboratory and an engineering consultant through her firm Grace Clark Signal Sciences in Livermore, California.

Education and career
Clark is a graduate of Purdue University. After continuing at Purdue for a master's degree, she completed a Ph.D. at the University of California, Santa Barbara. After working as a researcher for the Lawrence Livermore National Laboratory for more than 35 years, she retired in 2013.

Recognition
In 2007 Clark was elected as an IEEE Fellow "for contributions in block adaptive filtering".

Personal life
Clark is also a guitar, banjo, and Dobro player, specializing in western swing and bluegrass music.

References

External links
Grace Clark & Swingitude, Clark's music site

Year of birth missing (living people)
Living people
Acoustical engineers
American electrical engineers
American women engineers
Purdue University alumni
University of California, Santa Barbara alumni
Lawrence Livermore National Laboratory staff
Fellow Members of the IEEE
21st-century American women